Throat singing refers to several vocal practices found in different cultures around the world. The most distinctive feature of such vocal practices is to be associated to some type of guttural voice, that contrasts with the most common types of voices employed in singing, which are usually represented by chest (modal) and head (light, or falsetto) registers.  Also, throat singing is often described as producing the sensation of more than one pitch at a time, i.e., the listener perceives two or more distinct musical notes, while the singer is producing a single vocalization.

Throat singing, therefore, consists of a wide range of singing techniques that originally belong to particular cultures and seem to share some sounding characteristics that make them especially noticeable by other cultures and users of mainstream singing styles. The term originates from the translation of the Tuvan/Mongolian word Xhöömei/Xhöömi, that literally means throat, guttural. Ethnic groups from Russia, Mongolia, Japan, South Africa, Canada, Italy, China and India, among others, accept and normally employ the term throat singing to describe their special way of producing voice and song.

The term throat singing is obviously not precise, because any singing technique involves the sound generation in the "throat", i.e., the voice produced at the level of the larynx, which includes the vocal folds and other structures. Therefore it would be, in principle, admissible to refer to classical operatic singing or pop singing as "throat singing" for instance. However, the term throat is not adopted by the official terminology of anatomy (Terminologia Anatomica) and is not technically associated with most of the singing techniques. Many authors, performers, coaches and listeners associate throat singing with overtone singing. Throat singing and overtone singing are certainly not synonyms, contrary to what is inaccurately indicated by many dictionaries (e.g. , in the definition by Britannica) but, in some cases, both aspects may be clearly present, such as in the khargyraa technique from Tuva, with a very deep, tense voice, and rich overtone enhancements and embellishments.

Furthermore, "singing with the throat" may be regarded as a demeaning expression to some singers, because it may imply that the singer is using a high level of effort, resulting in a rather forced or non-suitable voice. The word "throaty" is usually associated to a rough, raspy, breathy or hoarse voice. In spite of being a term frequently used in the literature starting in the 1960's, some contemporary scholars tend to avoid the use of throat singing as a general term.

There is a consistent and enthusiastic international reception for concerts and workshops given by musical groups belonging to the several cultures that incorporate throat singing . Besides the traditional ethnic performances, throat singing is also cultivated and explored by numerous musicians belonging to contemporary, rock, new-age, pop and independent movements.

Types of throat singing 
Throat singing techniques may be classified under (1) an ethnomusicological approach: considering the various cultural aspects, the association to rituals, religious practices, storytelling, labor songs, vocal games, and other contexts; (2) a musical approach: considering their artistic use, the basic acoustical principles, and the physiological and mechanical procedures to learn, train and produce them.

The most commonly referred types of throat singing techniques, present in musicological and ethnomusicological texts, are generally associated with ancient cultures. Some of them, as the Khöömei from Mongolia, Tuva and China, and the Canto Tenore from Sardinia, are acknowledged by UNESCO as Intangible Cultural Heritage. 
 Tuvan throat singing (or Mongolian throat singing), a form of singing, comprising several techniques, practiced in the Republic of Tuva, belonging to the Russian federation., in Mongolia and in China.
 Buddhist chant, found in some monasteries in India (Tibetan exiled communities) and Tibet, sometimes involving vocal-ventricular phonation, i.e., combined vibrations of the (true) vocal folds and the (false) ventricular folds, achieving very low pitches.
 Inuit throat singing, the kind of duet as an entertaining contest, practiced by the Inuit of Canada
 Rekuhkara, formerly practiced by the Ainu ethnic group of Hokkaidō Island, Japan
 Canto a tenore, or Sardinian throat singing, found in the Italian island 

In musically related terms, throat singing refers among others, to the following specific techniques:
 Overtone singing, also known as overtone chanting, or harmonic singing. This is the singing style more commonly associated with throat singing.
 Undertone singing  i.e., techniques that comprise subharmonics, generated by the combined vibrations of parts of the singing apparatus at a certain frequency and frequencies that correspond to integer divisions of such frequency, such as 1:2, 1:3, and 1:4 ratios.
 Diplophonic voice, i.e., techniques that consist of parts of the singing apparatus vibrating at non-integer ratios, are usually regarded as associated with pathological processes - see diplophonia.
 Growling voice - consists of a technique of growling, which employs structures of the vocal apparatus located above the larynx, vibrating at the same time as the vocal folds, particularly the aryepiglottic folds.
 Vocal fry, a technique associated to vocal fry register.

Audio examples 

 Kargyraa.mp3
 Khoomei.mp3
 Sound samples, by Leonardo Fuks, at the Royal Institute of Technology, Sweden.

See also 

 Tuvan throat singing
 List of overtone musicians
Cantu a tenore

External links

 Throat Singing in Kangirsuk, a 2019 Canadian short documentary film
Mongolian traditional art of Khöömei  https://ich.unesco.org/en/RL/mongolian-traditional-art-of-khoomei-00396
Throat-singing article from Encyclopaedia Britannica   https://www.britannica.com/art/throat-singing
Webpage from Tran Quang Hai , one of the main and pioneer throat singing performers and researchers in the world, named “Tran Quang Hai’s World Throat Singing”

References 

Singing techniques
Human voice
Vocal skills
Vocal groups by nationality
Intangible Cultural Heritage of Humanity
Acoustics
Masterpieces of the Oral and Intangible Heritage of Humanity
Phonation
Voice registers